The skouterios  ("shield-bearer") was a Byzantine court office in the 13th–14th centuries, whose role was to carry the emperor's personal standard, the divellion.

History and functions
The office is very obscure, and is rarely mentioned in the sources. Although it is attested from the 13th century on in the Empire of Nicaea, most of what is known about it comes from the Book of Offices, written by pseudo-Kodinos in the middle of the 14th century. According to pseudo-Kodinos, the skouterios was responsible for bearing the emperor's banner, the so-called divellion (διβέλλιον) and the emperor's shield (σκουτάριον, skoutarion), not only in ceremonial processions, but whenever the emperor went about in public, including on campaign. The skouterios preceded the emperor, and the Varangian Guard followed behind the divellion. In imperial ceremonies, a number of other standards were also used, but the skouterios and the divellion always preceded them. The only exception was when the emperor visited a monastery, where the imperial bootmaker carried the divellion; the reason for this custom was unknown even to Kodinos.

In pseudo-Kodinos' work, the post occupies the 42nd place in the imperial hierarchy, between the prōtokynēgos and the amēralios. His court uniform was typical of the mid-level courtiers: a gold-brocaded hat (skiadion), a plain silk kabbadion, and a skaranikon (domed hat) covered in golden and lemon-yellow silk and decorated with gold wire and images of the emperor in front and rear, respectively depicted enthroned and on horseback. 

From the few holders known, the post was given to military commanders and fiscal officials. The term is also attested as a family name in Chalcidice, Constantinople, as well as in Trebizond.

List of known skouterioi

References

Sources

 
 
 
 
 

Byzantine court titles
Greek words and phrases